Dikgang "Uhuru" Moiloa is a South African politician who was Gauteng's Member of the Executive Council (MEC) for Local Government and Human Settlements from March 2018 to May 2019. He represented the African National Congress in the Gauteng Provincial Legislature from 1999 to 2019 and was formerly the Deputy Speaker in the legislature from 2014 to 2018.

Early life and activism 
Moiloa grew up in Dinokana, a region in the former Transvaal which was part of the Bophuthatswana bantustan during apartheid until it was incorporated into the North West province after 1994. He attended Dinokana Secondary School and said that the turning point of his political life was a lecture given at the school by anti-apartheid activist Onkgopotse Tiro. Moiloa was active in a local students' association while in high school. In December 1977, in the aftermath of the 1976 Soweto uprising and Bophuthatswana's declaration of independence, he left Dinokana for Johannesburg in present-day Gauteng province.

He subsequently became active in the anti-apartheid movement, including as a founding member of the Congress of South African Students in 1979, and he was arrested and trialled by the apartheid government for participating in a march in honour of activist Solomon Mahlangu. After his release, in the 1980s, he joined the African National Congress (ANC) underground.

Career in provincial government 
Moiloa was first elected to the Gauteng Provincial Legislature in 1999. He chaired several of the legislature's committees and at one stage was Chairperson of Committees ("Chair of Chairs") in the legislature. Pursuant to the 2014 general election, he was re-elected to his legislative seat, ranked 24th on the ANC's provincial party list, and was also elected unopposed as Deputy Speaker of the Gauteng Provincial Legislature. In that capacity he deputised Ntombi Mekgwe. While in the legislature, Moiloa also rose through the ranks of the ANC's regional branch in the West Rand and then of its provincial branch in Gauteng. He was a member of the Gauteng ANC's Provincial Executive Committee from 2008 until 2018.

He left the Deputy Speaker's office in March 2018, when David Makhura, the Premier of Gauteng, appointed him to the Gauteng Executive Council as Member of the Executive Council (MEC) for Local Government and Human Settlements. He succeeded Paul Mashatile, who had been elected to a full-time party office as ANC Treasurer-General. Moiloa's early tenure in the Executive Council was marked by widespread service delivery protests related to housing shortages in Gauteng. He was responsible for the portfolio until the 2019 general election, when he did not stand for re-election to the provincial legislature and was succeeded as MEC by Lebogang Maile, who took over the reconfigured portfolio of Human Settlements, Urban Planning, and Cooperative Governance and Traditional Affairs. Instead, Moiloa ran for election to a seat in the National Assembly, ranked 182nd on the ANC's national party list. He was not elected to a seat.

References

External links 

 

People from Ramotshere Moiloa Local Municipality
Living people
African National Congress politicians
Members of the Gauteng Provincial Legislature
21st-century South African politicians
Year of birth missing (living people)